Lądek  is a village in Słupca County, Greater Poland Voivodeship, in west-central Poland. It is the seat of the gmina (administrative district) called Gmina Lądek.

The village has a population of 790.

References

Villages in Słupca County